Kocain Cave is a cave in Antalya Province, southwestern Turkey. It is a registered natural monument.

The cave is situated in Killik location of Ahırtaş village at Döşemealtı district of Antalya Province. It was discovered in 1919, and was surveyed by scientists from Ankara University several times after 1946. First exploration in terms of speleology was carried out in cooperation with French speleologists in 1972. The cave features monumental stalactites and stalagmites. It is assumed that the cave was used for religious purposes during the early Christianity due to existence of readable inscriptions. Above data is taken from the cave's information board visible at external link.

The cave was registered a natural monument on August 16, 2013.

References

External links
Kocain Cave at YouTube

Natural monuments of Turkey
Protected areas established in 2013
2013 establishments in Turkey
Caves of Antalya Province
Döşemealtı District